Tomorr Sinani Sports Palace is a multi-use sports arena in Elbasan, Albania. It is owned and operated by the Municipality of Elbasan and it is the home of the multidisciplinary KS Elbasani.

References

Indoor arenas in Albania
Basketball venues in Albania
Sports venues in Albania
Indoor track and field venues
Buildings and structures in Elbasan
1982 establishments in Albania
Sports venues completed in 1982